Anwar Solangi (1944–2008) was a Pakistani television and radio performer. He was born in Shahdadpur, in Sindh.

Life

Solangi became an anchorperson at the Hyderabad radio station during Zulfiqar Ali Bhutto’s government but was later removed from the post by the subsequent Ziaul Haq regime. With about 500 plays in both Urdu and Sindhi languages, to his credit, Solangi was twice awarded PTV Awards for best actor and best supporting actor.

He also acted in the Urdu film Khwahish, He also worked in ten Sindhi-language films. Anwar Solangi wrote a book under his name called Wateyoo Veh Gadroo ('Dishes of Poison'), which includes his collection of articles which were published in various newspapers, his poetry, and his essays based on his personal life.

Anwar Solangi died after a long illness at the Civil Hospital, Karachi on 3 April 2008. He was 64, Anwar was buried at the Sakhi Hassan graveyard. Anwar Solangi left a wife, two daughters and a son.

Awards
 2010: Pride of Performance

Noted television plays
 Chhoti Si Duniya
 Dewarain
 Hawain
 Jungle
 Marvi
 Rani Jo Kahani (a Sindhi language drama)

See also 
 List of Lollywood actors

References

External links
 
 TV artist Anwar Solangi dies - DAWN.com

1944 births
2008 deaths
Sindhi people
People from Sanghar District
Pakistani male television actors
Pakistani radio presenters
Recipients of the Pride of Performance
Male actors from Karachi
Radio personalities from Karachi
PTV Award winners